The MLB Fan Cave was a building on 4th Street and Broadway in New York, designed by Paul DiMeo, where baseball fans, selected by Major League Baseball as part of its Dreamjob program, were tasked with watching every baseball game in the entire year.  According to Major League Baseball,   The "cave dwellers" (fans selected to live in the Fan Cave) were responsible for recording their experiences through social media, blogs, and videos (all online), as well as hosting concerts, fan events, and celebrity guests. It was located in the space formerly occupied by Tower Records’ famed Greenwich Village location.

2011 Season 
The MLB Fan Cave first opened at the beginning of the 2011 season with two cave dwellers, Mike O'Hara, a 37-year-old Yankee fan and Ryan Wagner, a 25-year-old Orioles fan, selected to live in the Fan Cave from a pool of 10,000 applicants. The application process included a video submission, writing samples, and interviews with MLB Network and MLB executives.

2013 Season 
In 2013, nine more Cave Dwellers joined the MLB Fan Cave. Also joining them in the Cave was a nine-armed octopus nicknamed, Nonopus. Throughout the season, a number of Major League Baseball players came to visit, including Josh Donaldson, José Bautista, David Ortiz, Andrew McCutchen and Cliff Lee, to name a few. The season ended with three finalists watching the Boston Red Sox win the World Series with Los Angeles Angels fan Danny Farris being named the winner of the season.

Closing 
On February 9, 2015, it was reported that the Fan Cave would cease existence, and the building would be used for other promotional events.

References

External links

Commercial buildings in Manhattan
Major League Baseball
2011 establishments in New York (state)
2015 disestablishments in New York (state)